Sankar Prasad Mitra (26 December 1917 – 9 August 1986) was a Bengali politician and former Chief Justice of the Calcutta High Court. He is one of the acting Governors of West Bengal and the longest serving Chief Justice of the Calcutta High Court.

Career
Mitra was born in 1917 in British India. He contested 1952 West Bengal Legislative Assembly election on behalf of Indian National Congress and won from Sealdah. He became the Minister of Law and Judicial Department under the Government of West Bengal. Mitra practised law and served as a standing counsel for the State and Central Governments in the High Court. He was appointed the Chief Justice of Calcutta High Court in 1972 and served up to 1979. He is the longest serving Chief Justice in the history of this High Court for a period of 7 years. In his tenure Mitra also served as acting Governor of West Bengal.

Family
Sankar Prasad Mitra was married to Aloka Mitra nee Bose, the only daughter of Sudhansu Mohan Bose, former Advocate general of West Bengal.

References

1917 births
Judges of the Calcutta High Court
Chief Justices of the Calcutta High Court
People from Kolkata
Indian National Congress politicians
West Bengal MLAs 1951–1957
Bengali politicians
Year of death unknown
20th-century Indian judges
20th-century Indian lawyers